Scrubby Creek is a rural locality in the Gympie Region, Queensland, Australia. In the  Scrubby Creek had a population of 55 people.

History
Scrubby Creek Provisional School opened on 20 August 1934. In 1935 it became Scrubby Creek State School. It closed on 6 May 1960.

In the  Scrubby Creek had a population of 55 people.

References 

Gympie Region
Localities in Queensland